This list of space stations is grouped by countries responsible for their operations. The space stations where multiple countries are responsible for their operations are listed separately. Planned and canceled space stations are excluded from this list.

Chinese space stations

Soviet/Russian space stations

United States space stations

Notes

References 

Space stations by country
Country